San Vito Lo Capo is a town and comune in North-Western Sicily, Italy, administratively part of the province of Trapani.  The small town is located in a valley between  mountains, and is home to a public beach that is destination of local vacationers. The town's primary industries are tourism and agriculture, particularly olive groves owned by small farmers.

The town's eastern border is provided by a small range of mountains, the northernmost of which is peaked by a large cross visible from the public beach below.  The mountain is  home to numerous caves, most of which are inaccessible without professional climbing gear. A  cave, accessible by foot at the southern base of the mountain, was named "Caverna della Capra Guasto," or "Cave of the Dead Goat" by explorers Christian D'Angelo and William Spears.

To the south is the Riserva naturale dello Zingaro. Other sights include the sanctuary-fortress, the chapel of Santa Crescenzia, the historical lighthouse, several tonnaras and the Torre dell'Usciere, a coastal watchtower.

San Vito Lo Capo is a well-known rock climbing destination.

Cultural events 

Since 1998 during the last week of September, the little town of San Vito Lo Capo has hosted the Cous Cous Fest, an international festival of Mediterranean culture and gastronomy, during which, in addition to live musical performances, there is an international couscous gastronomic competition "The Couscous World Championship", which involves chefs from all over the world, who compete by offering couscous cooked according to their own gastronomic tradition. The countries that joined this initiative are: Ivory Coast, France, Israel, Italy, Morocco, Palestine, Senegal and Tunisia. In recent years the duration of the "Couscous Fest" has been extended to 10 days.

The festival of books, authors and bougainvillea takes place in the period July–September of each year, presented by Giacomo Pilati as a series of meetings with the author in Via Venza, the town's outdoor lounge. Italian writers present their latest literary works in front of an audience. In May – after a tour of all Sicily – the International Kite Festival ends with a final stop in San Vito Lo Capo. Kite flyers of international fame meet in acrobatic kite sessions to the sound of music.

On 15 June the feast of the patron St Vito Martyr takes place. Celebrations begin in the afternoon with the ancient game of the antenna in the sea, in which competing participants have to walk on a 10-metre wooden beam suspended over the sea and made slippery with a layer of soap, the goal being to grab a flag at the end of the beam. The Disembarking of the Saints (a representation of the original) on the beach of St Vito Lo Capo follows, during which three performers arrive from the sea on a small boat at sunset, each representing the young Vitus, the nurse Crescenzia and master Modesto, while the fishermen wait on the beach to welcome them. In the meantime, inside the sanctuary the statue of St Vitus is covered by the votive of the faithful; then it is solemnly presented to the faithful and carried on the shoulders by the devotees in the final procession that tours around the village. The festivities end with a fireworks display.

In October, there is the San Vito Climbing Festival, an international festival for climbers, who can climb the mountains in the area.

References

External links 
 Official website
 Touristic website
 Cultural and touristic website 

Municipalities of the Province of Trapani